Garang Mawien Kuol (born 15 September 2004) is a professional footballer who plays as a forward for Scottish Premiership club Heart of Midlothian, on loan from Premier League club Newcastle United. Born in Egypt and raised in Australia to South Sudanese parents, he represents the Australia national team.

Early life
Kuol was born on 15 September 2004, in Egypt to South Sudanese parents. His family had fled Sudan, staying in Egypt for a year, before they moved to Australia as refugees, where they settled in Shepparton, Victoria. Kuol played junior football for the Goulburn Valley Suns and worked his way through their youth pathways before attracting the interest of A-League teams at the age of 16.

Playing career

Central Coast Mariners
Kuol joined Central Coast Mariners Academy in January 2021. Kuol made his debut for the Mariners' senior side at 17 years of age as a substitute in their 6–0 win against APIA Leichhardt in the 2021 FFA Cup on 21 December 2021 and scored seven minutes after coming on. On 5 April 2022, Kuol made his A-League Men debut and scored a goal in the Mariners' 5–0 win over Wellington Phoenix. Kuol went on to score four goals in his first seven A-League Men appearances. In June 2022, Kuol signed his first professional contract with the Mariners, a two-year deal. Kuol was one of two "Commissioner's picks" chosen to play in the 2022 A-Leagues All Stars Game against Barcelona.

On 13 November 2022, Kuol scored twice for the Mariners after coming on as a substitute in a 3–2 loss to Western United. His second goal, a powerful strike from a narrow angle, was named as the A-League Men's Goal of the Month for November 2022 by 10 News First, as selected by former Socceroo Alex Tobin.

Kuol made his first league start for the Mariners on 18 December 2022, setting up a goal in a 2–1 win over Sydney FC.

Newcastle United
In mid-September 2022, it was reported that Kuol had signed a pre-agreement and would transfer to English Premier League side Newcastle United during the January 2023 transfer window. On 30 September 2022, Newcastle United signed Kuol, who officially joined the club on 1 January 2023.

Loan to Heart of Midlothian
On 12 January 2023, Kuol was loaned to Scottish Premiership club Heart of Midlothian until the end of the 2022–23 season. He made his debut at Tynecastle Park the following day, coming on as a substitute for Barrie McKay at the 77th minute of a 1–0 league victory over St Mirren.

International career

Youth
Kuol was called up to an Australian under-20 talent identification camp in August 2022. He scored a spectacular goal in the camp's intra-squad match.

In October 2022, Kuol was called up to the Australian under-20 side for 2023 AFC U-20 Asian Cup qualification matches in Kuwait. Kuol's coach at Central Coast Mariners, Nick Montgomery, was critical of the selection, arguing that Kuol would have better chances of selection for the 2022 FIFA World Cup by playing consistently for the Mariners in the 2022–23 A-League Men. Kuol scored in Australia's second qualifying game, a win over India, with a long-range shot.

Senior
In September 2022, Kuol earned his first senior national team call up, being selected in the Australian squad to play two friendlies against New Zealand. He made his debut at 18 years and 10 days of age as a second-half substitute in the second game of the New Zealand series, earning plaudits for a number of dangerous contributions in attack. Kuol's debut made him the sixth-youngest "Socceroo" of all time, and the youngest to be selected in an Australia squad since Harry Kewell.

Kuol was named in Australia's squad for the 2022 FIFA World Cup in November 2022 at 18 years old, making him the youngest player ever selected for Australia for a FIFA World Cup. Kuol came on as a substitute in the second half of Australia's loss to France in their opening game of the Cup on 22 November 2022, becoming the youngest player to appear at a World Cup for Australia and the ninth-youngest player ever to take the field at a FIFA World Cup. Kuol also came on as a substitute in Australia's round of sixteen loss to Argentina, making him the youngest player to feature in a FIFA World Cup knockout match since Pelé at the 1958 FIFA World Cup. Kuol had a late chance to equalise for Australia, however, his shot was saved by Argentinian goalkeeper Emiliano Martínez.

Personal life
Kuol has three older brothers and three younger brothers.  One of his older brothers, Alou Kuol, currently plays for VfB Stuttgart, after having previously played for the Goulburn Valley Suns and the Central Coast Mariners. Another older brother, Teng Kuol, currently plays for Western Sydney Wanderers FC Youth, after previously playing for the Central Coast Mariners Academy and Melbourne Victory FC Youth.

Career statistics

Honours
Individual
A-Leagues All Star: 2022

References

External links

2004 births
Living people
Australian soccer players
Australia international soccer players
South Sudanese footballers
Australian people of South Sudanese descent
South Sudanese emigrants to Australia
Sportspeople of South Sudanese descent
Egyptian refugees
Association football forwards
Central Coast Mariners FC players
National Premier Leagues players
A-League Men players
2022 FIFA World Cup players
Australian expatriate sportspeople in England
Expatriate footballers in England
Newcastle United F.C. players
Australian expatriate sportspeople in Scotland
Expatriate footballers in Scotland
Heart of Midlothian F.C. players
Scottish Professional Football League players